The British Veterinary Association (BVA) is the national body for veterinary surgeons in the United Kingdom and is a not-for-profit organisation. Its purpose is that of knowledge dissemination, and not professional validation or academic competence. Knowledge dissemination is important in the veterinary profession to prevent a knowledge divide.

History

National Veterinary Association
A preceding organisation started out as the National Veterinary Association in 1882 after the first ever British National Veterinary Congress in July 1881. A vet, George Banham, had suggested the idea of a national veterinary association. George Fleming, the principal vet to the Armed Forces, was the first elected president. The association was open to any vet, no matter which country they were from, on the payment of half a guinea. Other previous veterinary associations still co-existed though. It had an informal organisation and meetings across the country were arranged on an ad hoc basis. This style of organisation did not suit many vets, who wanted an organisation where they could discuss matters which did not or could not be discussed by the RCVS. In 1909 at a meeting of the Scottish Metropolitan Veterinary Association, Professor Orlando Charnock Bradley of the Edinburgh Veterinary College, called for a 'one single British veterinary association'. The idea was generally accepted, but the First World War stopped anything from happening.

National Veterinary Medical Association
At a meeting on 31 October 1919 the National Veterinary Medical Association was formed. Orlando Charnock Bradley became this association's first president. The co-existent veterinary associations no longer continued. The NVMA became a coherent regulated organisation and started to achieve things for vets, the country, and not-least the world. It has profoundly helped animal welfare and food production.

In 1952, it became the BVA.

In 1984, it founded the BVA Animal Welfare Foundation.

Activities
The organisation issues advice and the consensus of professional opinion to members and to the general public about veterinary issues as they arise in current events or trends, such as Avian flu, foot and mouth, and Brexit.
The organisation has over 19,000 members.

Structure
The current president is Malcolm Morley. The current senior vice president is Justine Shotton and the current junior vice president is Anna Judson. The association's headquarters is situated on Mansfield Street, Marylebone, London.

Publications
British Veterinary Association works with contractor Wiley to publish the BVA's journals, the Veterinary Record and In Practice. The latter dates back to 1979 and is published ten times a year. The Veterinary Record has been in publication since 1888 with members able to search within its voluminous archives dating back to 1996. BMJ also publish Veterinary Record Open and Veterinary Record Case Reports for BVA.

See also
 Royal College of Veterinary Surgeons
 Veterinary medicine
 British Medical Association
 Association of Veterinary Anaesthetists

References

External links
 British Veterinary Association
 BVA weekly journal Vet Record
 BVA monthly journal In Practice
 BVA online journal Vet Record Open
 BVA online journal Vet Record Case Reports
 British Veterinary Nursing Association
 BVA Animal Welfare Foundation
 Association of Veterinary Students
 International Veterinary Students Association

Video clips
 Vets.TV

Animal welfare organisations based in the United Kingdom
Trade associations based in the United Kingdom
Medical associations based in the United Kingdom
Organisations based in the City of Westminster
Organizations established in 1919
Veterinary medicine in the United Kingdom
Veterinary medicine-related professional associations
1919 establishments in the United Kingdom